Rhonda Schwandt is an American gymnast.

Competitions
In 1978 she won a gold medal in vaulting competition during the Moscow News Gymnastics Tournament, as well as a bronze medal on parallel bars and balance beam. In 1979 she won the all-around title at the Pacific Gymnastics Championships.

Original "Supersister"
In 1979, the Supersisters trading card set was produced and distributed; one of the cards featured Schwandt's name and picture.

References

American female artistic gymnasts
Year of birth missing (living people)
Living people
21st-century American women